The 1881–82 season was due to be the fourth season in which Bolton Wanderers competed in a senior competitive football competition. The club originally entered the FA Cup and were drawn to play Preston Zingari. However, both clubs withdrew due to a professional argument with The Football Association.

See also
Bolton Wanderers F.C. seasons

References

Bolton Wanderers F.C. seasons
Bolton Wanderers F.C.